Otinodoris is a genus of sea slugs, dorid nudibranchs, shell-less marine gastropod mollusks previously placed in the family Chromodorididae. It is now considered a synonym of Asteronotus Ehrenberg, 1831 and placed in the family Discodorididae

Valdés (2002)  tentatively tried to maintain Otinodoris as a separate genus, but lacked the necessary data. It was then considered possible that Otinodoris was a synonym of Peltodoris Bergh, 1880.

It is now considered a synonym of Asteronotus Ehrenberg, 1831 and placed in the family Discodorididae

Species
Species in the genus Otinodoris include:
 Otinodoris winckworthi]' White, 1948 : synonym of Asteronotus raripilosa'' (Abraham, 1877)

References

Chromodorididae
Gastropod genera